Caesium hexafluorocuprate is the inorganic compound with the chemical formula . It is a red solid that degrades upon contact with water. It was first prepared be heating  and caesium fluoride at 410°C under 350 atmospheres of fluorine:
2 CsCuCl3 + 2 CsF + 5 F2 → 2 Cs2CuF6 + 3 Cl2

The anion [CuF6]2- is a rare example of a copper(IV) complex.  In terms of its electronic structure, the anion has a low-spin d7 configuration.  It is thus susceptible to Jahn-Teller distortion.

Further reading

References 

Caesium compounds
Copper compounds
Fluoro complexes
Metal halides
Fluorometallates